2016–17 Superliga Femenina de Voleibol was the 48th season since its establishment in 1970. Twelve teams played the championship this season.

The season comprises regular season and championship playoff. Regular season started on October 15, 2016 and ended on March 25, 2017. Championship playoff began on April 9 with semifinals.

Top four teams when finishing regular season play playoff while two bottom teams are relegated.

Naturhouse Ciudad de Logroño won its four title in a row (2014, 2015, 2016 & 2017) after defeating Fïgaro Peluqueros Haris in the Championship Final playoff 3–0.

Teams

Regular season standings

Championship playoff

Bracket

Final

Match 1

|}

Match 2

|}

Match 3

|}

Top scorers
(Regular season and playoff statistic combined.)

References

External links
Official website

1ªFemale
2017 in women's volleyball
2017 in Spanish sport
2016 in women's volleyball
2016 in Spanish sport